Addenbrooke is a surname of English origin. People with this surname include:

 John Addenbrooke (philanthropist) (1680–1719), English doctor and benefactor of Addenbrooke's hospital
 John Addenbrooke (priest), Dean of Lichfield
 John Addenbrooke (footballer) (1900–61), English footballer
 Jack Addenbrooke (1865–1922), English football player and manager

See also
Addenbrooke's Hospital, Cambridge, England
Addenbrooke's Charitable Trust (ACT), charity supporting the hospital